Citizen Potawatomi Nation is a federally recognized tribe of Potawatomi people located in Oklahoma. The Potawatomi are traditionally an Algonquian-speaking Eastern Woodlands tribe. They have 29,155 enrolled tribal members, of whom 10,312 live in the state of Oklahoma.

Government
The Citizen Potawatomi Nation is headquartered in Shawnee, Oklahoma. Their tribal jurisdictional area is in Cleveland and Pottawatomie Counties, Oklahoma. Of the 37,264 enrolled members, 10,312 live within the state of Oklahoma. They have their housing authority and issue tribal vehicle tags.

Enrollment in the tribe is based on lineal descent; that is to say, the tribe has no minimum blood quantum.

Current administration
Executive Branch:
Chairman: John A. Barrett
Vice Chairman: Linda Capps
Secretary/Treasurer: D. Wayne Trousdale

Legislative Branch:

District #1: Alan Melot, Joplin, MO
District #2: Eva Marie Carney, Arlington, VA
District #3: Robert Whistler, Bedford, TX
District #4: Jon Boursaw, Topeka, KS
District #5: Gene Lambert, Mesa, AZ
District #6: Rande Payne, Visalia, CA
District #7: Mark Johnson, Fresno, CA
District #8: Dave Carney, Olympia, WA
District #9: Paul Wesselhoft, Moore, OK
District #10: David Barrett, Shawnee, OK
District #11: Andy Walters, Shawnee, OK
District #12: Paul Schmidlkofer, Tecumseh, OK
District #13: Bobbie Bowden, Choctaw, OK

Economic development
They operate a truck stop, two gas stations, two smoke shops, a bingo hall, two tribal casinos, FireLake Discount Foods in Shawnee, FireLake Golf Course, and First National Bank and Trust, with two locations in Shawnee, one in Holdenville, two in Lawton, and three in communities surrounding Lawton. Their estimated economic impact is $422.4 million.  In March of 2023 the nation was preparing the launch of tribal-owned Sovereign Pipe Technologies, LLC., an HDPE pipe manufacturer, being the first business located at the tribe’s 700-acre industrial park called Iron Horse.  The industrial park, located about 35 minutes west of Oklahoma City near Shawnee, is less than 10 miles from Interstate 40 and has a connection to the national rail network through the Arkansas-Oklahoma Railroad (AOK).

Culture
In January 2006, the tribe opened its extensive Citizen Potawatomi Nation Museum and Cultural Heritage Center in Shawnee. The  building houses the nation's research library, archives, genealogy research center, veteran's Wall of Honor, exhibit and meeting space, and a museum store.

The tribe's annual intertribal powwow is no longer held. The Citizen Potawatomi Nation's Family Reunion Festival is held on the final Saturday of June each year. It attracts about 5,000 CPN members and their family members for a variety of cultural and other activities over a three-day period.

History
The Citizen Potawatomi Nation is the successor apparent to the Mission Band of Potawatomi Indians, located originally in the Wabash River valley of Indiana. With the Indian Removal Act after the 1833 Treaty of Chicago, the Mission Band was forced to march to a new reserve in Kansas. Of the 850 Potawatomi people forced to move, more than 40 died along the way. The event is known in Potawatomi history as the Potawatomi Trail of Death.

In Kansas, the Mission Band of Potawatomi lived on a small reserve with the Prairie Band Potawatomi Nation. The Prairie Band had adapted to the Plains culture but the Mission Band remained steadfast to the Woodlands culture. Both cultural groups exhibited very different ceremonial and subsistence strategies, yet were forced to share the land. Seeking a better opportunity for its people, the Mission Band leaders chose to take small farms rather than live together with the Prairie Band. Shortly thereafter, and not fully understanding the tax system, most of the new individual allotments of land passed out of Mission Band ownership and into that of white settlers and traders. In 1867, Mission Potawatomi members signed a treaty selling their Kansas lands in order to purchase lands in Indian Territory with the proceeds. To reinforce the new land purchase and learning from their Kansas experience, tribal members took U.S. citizenship. From that time on, they became known as the Citizen Potawatomi.

By the early 1870s, most of the Citizen Potawatomi had resettled in Indian Territory, present-day Oklahoma, forming several communities near present-day Shawnee. In 1890, the Citizen Potawatomi participated, unwillingly, in the allotment process implemented through the Dawes Act of 1887. With this Act, the Citizen Potawatomi people were forced to accept individual allotments again.

Notable tribal members
 Woody Crumbo (1912–1989), artist, flautist, dancer
 Mary Killman (born 1991), Olympic synchronized swimmer
 Robin Wall Kimmerer (born 1953), environmental scientist, educator, author
 Tyler Bray (born 1991), an American football quarterback
 Ron Baker (born 1993), Retired Basketball Player 
 Kellie Coffey (born 1971), singer, songwriter, Winner Academy of Country Music Award Top New Female 2003
 Creed Humphrey (born 1999), an American football center

See also

Potawatomi
Forest County Potawatomi Community, Wisconsin
Hannahville Indian Community, Michigan
Match-e-be-nash-she-wish Band of Pottawatomi Indians of Michigan
Nottawaseppi Huron Band of the Potawatomi, Michigan
Pokagon Band of Potawatomi Indians, Michigan and Indiana
Prairie Band of Potawatomi Nation, Kansas

Notes

External links
Citizen Potawatomi Nation's official website
Citizen Potawatomi Nation's Gaming Commission official website
Citizen Potawatomi Nation's official election website
Citizen Potawatomi Nation's official employment website

 
Great Lakes tribes
Anishinaabe groups
Federally recognized tribes in the United States
Native American tribes in Oklahoma